Anatoli Mikhailovich Leshchenkov (born November 11, 1946) is a Russian professional football coach and a former player.

External links
 Career summary by KLISF

1946 births
Living people
Soviet footballers
Russian football managers
Association football midfielders